Ramón Armando Favela Álvarez (born 23 April 1986) is a Mexican professional golfer who plays on PGA Tour Latinoamérica.

Having graduated from Loyola University Chicago in 2009 as the most accomplished golfer in the university's history, Favela turned pro the following year. He made his debut on the Web.com Tour in the same year but has failed to be successful on this tour making just three appearances and just one cut on the Web.com Tour. He made his full debut on PGA Tour Latinoamérica in 2012 at the Mundo Maya Open and made the cut finishing in 11th  and continues to play most of his golf on PGA Tour Latinoamérica.

In March 2014 he made his first professional win on PGA Tour Latinoamérica by winning the Stella Artois Open at La Reunion Golf Resort in Antigua, Guatemala, by birdieing the final hole to win by a single shot over Nelson Ledesma. He also finished second at the Abierto de Chile and eighth at the Mexico Open, therefore he ended seventh in the Order of Merit.

Professional wins (4)

PGA Tour Latinoamérica wins (1)

Gira de Golf Profesional Mexicana wins (3)

References

External links
 
 

Mexican male golfers
PGA Tour Latinoamérica golfers
Golfers from California
Loyola Ramblers men's golfers
People from Coronado, California
Sportspeople from Tijuana
1986 births
Living people
21st-century Mexican people